The 2016 Vivo Tennis Cup was a professional tennis tournament played on clay courts. It was the first edition of the tournament which was part of the 2016 ATP Challenger Tour. It took place in Rio de Janeiro, Brazil between 18 and 24 January 2016.

Singles main-draw entrants

Seeds

 1 Rankings are as of January 11, 2016.

Other entrants
The following players received wildcards into the singles main draw:
  Wilson Leite
  Thiago Monteiro
  Pedro Sakamoto
  Carlos Eduardo Severino

The following player received entry to the main draw as an alternate:
  Axel Michon

The following players received entry from the qualifying draw:
  Andrea Collarini
  Gonzalo Escobar 
  Peter Torebko 
  Clement Geens

The following player received entry as a lucky loser:
  Fabrício Neis

Champions

Singles

 Facundo Bagnis def.  Guilherme Clezar 6–4, 4–6, 6–2

Doubles

 Gastão Elias /  André Ghem def.  Jonathan Eysseric /  Miguel Ángel Reyes-Varela 6–4, 7–6(7–2)

External links

Vivo Tennis Cup